Kirsten Baesler is the North Dakota Superintendent of Public Instruction, a position she has held since her election in 2012. Baesler is originally from Flasher, North Dakota. Originally a library assistant, she later became a library media specialist, eventually working her way to up to an assistant principal in Bismarck, North Dakota. At the time of her election, Baesler was serving as president of the Mandan School Board.

Electoral history

References

21st-century American politicians
21st-century American women politicians
North Dakota Republicans
North Dakota Superintendents of Public Instruction
People from Mandan, North Dakota
School board members in North Dakota
Women in North Dakota politics